Mohamed Nabil Benabdallah (born 3 June 1959) is a Moroccan politician who has served as Minister of Housing and Urbanism of Morocco since 2012, as part of the cabinet of Abdelilah Benkirane.

Born in Rabat, Nabil Benabdallah started his career as a translator in the Moroccan courts. Between 1997 and 2000 he was executive director of the Party of Progress and Socialism's official newspapers al-Bayan and Bayan al-Yawm.

In 2010, he was elected as the Secretary General of the Party of Progress and Socialism, succeeding Moulay Ismaïl Alaoui.

References

External links
Official website
Ministry of Housing

Living people
Ministers of Communications of Morocco
Government ministers of Morocco
Ambassadors of Morocco to Italy
People from Rabat
Moroccan translators
Moroccan diplomats
INALCO alumni
1959 births
Moroccan male journalists
Members of the House of Councillors (Morocco)
Alumni of Lycée Descartes (Rabat)
Party of Progress and Socialism politicians